Patrik Andiné (born 11 July 1968 in Gothenburg) is a Swedish painter. He was educated at the Royal Institute of Art in 1990–1995. He has become known for his colourful oil paintings with mysterious and dreamlike scenes. He frequently aims to paint archetypical subjects drawn from the subconscious. An important influence is fairy tales and their often serious undertones. A recurring subject is scouting, which Andiné regards as a positive symbol for belonging, as well as something slightly uncomfortable, as the uniforms remind him of the Hitler Youth.

Although sometimes labeled as such, he does not consider himself a surrealist.

Selected solo exhibitions
 1992: Galleri Maximus, Borås, Sweden
 1994: Galleri Mejan, Sockholm, Sweden
 1997: Galleri Fahl, Stockholm, Sweden
 1997: Galleri 1, Gothenburg, Sweden
 1997: Swedish Art Edition, Gothenburg, Sweden
 1997: Galleri Mittbrodt´s, Borgholm, Sweden
 1999: Galleri Wallner, Malmö, Sweden
 2000: Galleri Fahl, Stockholm, Sweden
 2001: Borås konstmuseum, Sweden
 2001: Galleri 1, Gothenburg, Sweden
 2003: Galleri Fahl, Stockholm, Sweden
 2003: Kabusa Konsthall, Sweden
 2004: Halmstad konstklubb, Sweden
 2005: Galleri 1, Gothenburg, Sweden
 2006: Knäpper + Baumgarten, Stockholm, Sweden
 2007: Galleri Mittbrodt´s, Borgholm, Sweden
 2008: Angelika Knäpper Gallery, Stockholm, Sweden
 2008: Galleri 1, Gothenburg, Sweden
 2009: Alingsås konsthall, Sweden
 2011: Galleri 1, Gothenburg, Sweden
 2012: Angelika Knäpper Gallery, Stockholm, Sweden
 2012: Lars Lerins Sandgrund, Karlstad, Sweden
 2015: Lars Bohman Gallery, Stockholm, Sweden

References

1968 births
20th-century Swedish painters
20th-century Swedish male artists
21st-century Swedish painters
21st-century Swedish male artists
Living people
People from Gothenburg